The Thorn is a comic, religious satire.  It was first shown as The Greatest Story Overtold at the Detroit Institute of Art in 1971 then re-released on May 24, 1974, as The Divine Mr. J. It was released on video in the early 1980s as The Thorn. It was written, directed and produced by Peter Alexander. Its release was legally challenged on grounds that its title and advertising deceptively exploited the fame of its co-star, Bette Midler.

Plot

Cast
The Thorn starred John Hassberger as Jesus Christ with supporting roles of Bette Midler as the Virgin Mary; James Harrison as Joseph; John Greenburg as John the Baptist; Fred LaBour as the Angel Fred; Richard Pollard as Rabbi Gabriel; Diana David as Salome; and Jack Castor and Chi Chi as queens.

All of these actors were unknown and had no other film credits, with the exception of Bette Midler who was just beginning to build her singing career, had acted in a Broadway musical, and had briefly played a lead role in the off-Broadway musical Salvation in 1969. Midler had a brief appearance as a boat passenger in the 1966 film Hawaii.

Conception and production
Originally conceived as The Greatest Story Overtold, an irreverent spoof of the 1965 movie The Greatest Story Ever Told, the film was influenced by the increase in popularity and profitability of Christian evangelism. Peter McWilliams wrote, produced, directed and edited the film under the pseudonym Peter Alexander. He went on to write a broad range of mostly self-published, popular books.

Filmed in 16mm on a shoestring budget, the crew included Paul Josephson on camera and lighting, Craig Reynolds and Jay Cassidy on camera, and Jon Duff on sound recording. It was filmed mostly in a suburb of Detroit, Michigan from 1970 to 1971.

Release, marketing and legal challenge

After its premiere showing in Detroit, the film remained underground until it was released by National Entertainment Corp. as The Divine Mr. J a few years later, to capitalize on Midler's growing fame as "The Divine Miss M." Its premiere showing under the new title at the Festival Theater in New York City on May 24, 1974, was picketed by Midler's agent, who also challenged the film's title and marketing in court. The film received very poor reviews and soon closed.

The Divine Mr. J was re-released by Rochelle Films, Inc. in 1980 after Bette Midler's starring role in The Rose. It was blocked from opening in the U.S., but it did show overseas in the early 1980s. It received poor reviews.

The film reappeared as The Thorn on a Magnum Entertainment VHS video release around 1984. It was again blocked by the courts and returned underground.

See also
 List of American films of 1974
 List of films banned in the United States

References

External links

1974 films
1974 comedy films
American comedy films
Films based on the Gospels
Religious comedy films
Portrayals of the Virgin Mary in film
Cultural depictions of John the Baptist
Religious satire films
Censorship in the United States
American satirical films
1970s parody films
Portrayals of Saint Joseph in film
1970s English-language films
1970s American films